Marit Sandvei (born 21 May 1987) is a Norwegian football defender currently playing in the Toppserien for Lillestrøm SK, with whom she has also played in the Champions League.

She has been a member of the Norway women's national football team, taking part in UEFA Women's Euro 2009 and being recalled to the squad for the 2015 FIFA Women's World Cup.

References

External links
 
 Norwegian national team profile 
 LSK club profile 

1987 births
Living people
Norwegian women's footballers
2015 FIFA Women's World Cup players
LSK Kvinner FK players
Norway women's international footballers
Toppserien players
Women's association football defenders
Women's association football midfielders